Yordanis, Yordanys or Yordenis is a masculine given name which is borne by:

 Yordanis or Yordany Álvarez (born 1985), Cuban retired footballer
 Yordanis Arencibia (born 1980), Cuban judoka
 Yordanis Borrero (born 1978), Cuban weightlifter
 Yordanis Despaigne (born 1980), Cuban boxer
 Yordanys Durañona (born 1988), Cuban-born Dominican triple jumper
 Yordanis García (born 1988), Cuban decathlete
 Yordenis Ugás (born 1986), Cuban boxer

Cuban given names
Masculine given names